Carden House may refer to:

David A. Carden House, Houston, Texas, listed on the National Register of Historic Places (NRHP)
James B. Carden House, Summersville, West Virginia, NRHP-listed

See also
Carden Rockshelter, Brigham, Wisconsin, NRHP-listed